Ride Connection is a private, nonprofit organization that provides fixed bus route and paratransit services in the Portland metropolitan area in the U.S. state of Oregon. It was founded as Volunteer Transport, Inc. on May 26, 1988.

History

Volunteer Transport, Inc. (VTI) was founded on May 26, 1988.

Paratransit services

Ride Connection provides paratransit services to anyone over the age of 60 or with a disability, and people with low income. It complements TriMet's LIFT.

Fixed-route networks

Ride Connection refers to its fixed bus route services as "Community Connectors". As of 2021, it operates five separate Community Connectors in communities mostly within Washington County. Riders may schedule an off-route pick up (within  mile of the route) by calling in. Ride Connection also partners with the Tillamook County Transportation District by subsidizing a Wave bus route between Banks, North Plains, and Portland. All services are free to use. In May 2021, Ride Connection expanded its services in Washington County.

GroveLink

GroveLink serves Forest Grove with two routes: West Loop and East Loop. A third, less-frequent route called the Employment Loop operates in the early mornings and early afternoons. GroveLink originated from a study that discovered a need for a more local service than TriMet bus route 57–TV Highway/Forest Grove, which had operated as the only public transit service within Forest Grove with a single route along Pacific Avenue (Oregon Route 8) eastward to Hillsboro and Beaverton. It began operating on August 19, 2013.

North Hillsboro Link

The North Hillsboro Link began operating on November 16, 2015.

Tualatin Shuttle

The Tualatin Shuttle serves Tualatin with three, color-designated routes, all of which connect at the Tualatin WES station, served by TriMet's WES Commuter Rail. The Tualatin Shuttle began as the "Tualatin Employment Shuttle", established by the Tualatin Chamber of Commerce in 1997. Ride Connection took over its operations on October 1, 2014. The Blue Line operates a loop route west of the WES station within neighborhoods surrounding Herman Road. The Red Line operates another loop route south and east of the WES station with stops at the Tualatin Library and Legacy Meridian Park Medical Center. In September 2021, Ride Connection introduced a third route that runs from Bridgeport Village, the WES station, Legacy Meridian Park Medical Center, and Borland Free Clinic. Service operates from Monday to Friday in coordination with WES train arrivals.

References

External links 
 

Transit agencies in Oregon
Transportation in Portland, Oregon

Non-profit organizations based in Oregon